Betty Morgan may refer to:

Betty Morgan (politician) (1904–1981), Welsh author and politician
Betty Morgan (bowls) (born 1942), Welsh bowler
Betty Morgan, character in Teenagers from Outer Space, played by Dawn Bender

See also
Elizabeth Morgan (disambiguation)
Betsy Morgan (disambiguation)